Jenny Josefina Hjohlman (born 13 February 1990) is a Swedish footballer. She plays as a forward for the Italian Serie B club Brescia and for Sweden women's national football team.

Club career

After five seasons with Sundsvalls DFF, Hjohlman joined Damallsvenskan team Umeå IK ahead of the 2012 season on a two-year contract. Upon Umeå's relegation in the 2016 season, Hjohlman transferred to KIF Örebro DFF on a one-year contract with an option for an extension.

International career
Hjohlman made her debut for the senior Sweden team in a 4–1 win over England on 4 July 2013.

Coach Pia Sundhage named Hjohlman in the Sweden squad for UEFA Women's Euro 2013.

References

External links

 
 
  (archive)
  (archive) 
 

Living people
1990 births
Swedish women's footballers
Sweden women's international footballers
Damallsvenskan players
Umeå IK players
2015 FIFA Women's World Cup players
Sportspeople from Gävleborg County
Women's association football forwards
KIF Örebro DFF players
Florentia San Gimignano S.S.D. players
Expatriate women's footballers in Italy
Swedish expatriate sportspeople in Italy
Swedish expatriate women's footballers
Serie A (women's football) players
S.S.D. Empoli Ladies FBC players
S.S.D. Napoli Femminile players
A.C.F. Brescia Calcio Femminile players
Sundsvalls DFF players